Skalna Klet Stadium or simply Skalna Klet  is a multi-purpose stadium in Celje, Slovenia. It was used for football matches and was the home ground of the Slovenian PrvaLiga team NK Celje until 2003. Now it is used only as a training facility.

References

External links
ZPO profile 
Stadioni.org profile 

Football venues in Slovenia
Multi-purpose stadiums in Slovenia
Sports venues completed in 1904